The 2008–09 international cricket season was between September 2008 and March 2009. The season saw the security concerns for cricket in Pakistan reach a pinnacle. The ICC Champions Trophy, scheduled to be held in Pakistan in September 2008, was postponed to 2009 after five of the participating nations refused to send their teams for the event. In November 2008, a Pakistani militant group launched terror attacks in Mumbai. This led to India cancelling their tour of Pakistan originally scheduled for January and February 2009. Sri Lanka agreed to tour Pakistan in place of India but the tour was jeopardised by a terror attack in Lahore where gunmen fired at a bus carrying the Sri Lankan team, injuring six members of the team. The Champions Trophy was later relocated to South Africa and no international cricket were played in Pakistan for more than five years. This period of isolation ended when Zimbabwe toured Pakistan in May 2015. After successfully hosting few T20Is against World-XI, Sri Lanka cricket team and the West Indians from 2017 to 2018, few matches of Pakistan Super League from 2017 to 2019, whole season in 2020 as well as hosting complete tours against Sri Lankan and Bangladeshi cricket teams respectively during the 2019–20 season, built good reputation of Pakistan. Hence, by the end of 2019, the Pakistan Cricket Board, announced that they would no longer play any of their future home matches at a neutral venue, indicating that International Cricket has returned to the country on full-time basis.

Season overview

Pre-season rankings

September

ICC Intercontinental Cup

Win – 14 points
Draw if more than 8 hours of play lost – 3 points (otherwise 0 points)
First Innings leader – 6 points (independent of final result)
Abandoned without a ball played – 10 points.

Note: For matches in previous seasons, see the main article

October

World Cricket League Division 4

Final Placings

Australia in India

New Zealand in Bangladesh

Quadrangular Twenty20 Series in Canada

Associates Tri-Series in Kenya

Kenya in South Africa

November

Bangladesh in South Africa

Pakistan vs West Indies in the United Arab Emirates

England in India

 2 further ODIs were scheduled for Guwahati (29 November) and Delhi (2 December) but were cancelled for security reasons following the 2008 Mumbai Terrorist Attacks. The 1st Test was moved from Ahmedabad to Chennai and the 2nd Test from Mumbai to Mohali. After initially flying home, England flew out to Abu Dhabi on 4 December for a training camp, before then returning to India for the test series.

New Zealand in Australia

Sri Lanka in Zimbabwe

ICC Americas Division 1 Championship

The ICC Americas Division 1 Championship took place Fort Lauderdale in Florida from 25 November. Six nations took part: hosts USA, holders Bermuda, Canada, Cayman Islands, Argentina and debutants Suriname. United States won the tournament.

December

West Indies in New Zealand

South Africa in Australia

Sri Lanka in Bangladesh

 The first test included a rest day on 29 December due to the Bangladeshi general elections.

January

Tri-Series in Bangladesh

Zimbabwe in Bangladesh

Sri Lanka in Pakistan

As a result of the firing in Lahore where several Sri Lankan players were injured, the 2nd Test was abandoned and Sri Lanka immediately returned home.

ICC World Cricket League Division Three

Zimbabwe in Kenya

India in Sri Lanka

February

England in West Indies

 The 2nd Test was abandoned due to an unfit outfield. Therefore, an extra test was arranged to be played at the Antigua Recreation Ground, starting 2 days after the abandonment.

Women's Tri-Series in Bangladesh 

 advanced to the Final

India in New Zealand

Australia in South Africa

March

Women's World Cup

Season summary

Result Summary

Stats Leaders

Test

ODI

T20I

Milestones

Test
  Sachin Tendulkar reached 12,000 runs in Test on 17 October (vs Australia) 1st All Time
  Sourav Ganguly reached 7,000 runs in Test on 18 October (vs Australia) 33rd All Time
  V. V. S. Laxman played his 100th Test match on 6 November (vs Australia) 46th All Time
  Harbhajan Singh reached 300 wickets in Test on 7 November (vs Australia) 22nd All Time
  Sachin Tendulkar reached 100 catches in Test on 10 November (vs Australia) 27th All Time
  Brett Lee reached 300 wickets in Test on 22 November (vs New Zealand) 23rd All Time
  Matthew Hayden played his 100th Test match on 28 November (vs New Zealand) 47th All Time
  Ricky Ponting captained his 50th Test match on 28 November (vs New Zealand) 12th All Time
  Billy Bowden umpired his 50th Test match ( vs ) on 11 December 10th All time
  Graeme Smith reached 6,000 runs in Test on 20 December (vs Australia) 49th All time
  Chris Gayle reached 5,000 runs in Test on 20 December (vs New Zealand) 72nd All time
  Jacques Kallis took his 250th wicket in Test on 26 December (vs Australia) 31st All time
  Chaminda Vaas took his 350th wicket in Test on 26 December (Bangladesh) 19th All time
  Mahela Jayawardene played his 100th Test match on 3 January (vs Bangladesh) 48th All time
  Ramnaresh Sarwan reached 5,000 runs in Test on 6 January (vs England) 73rd All time
  Mahela Jayawardene reached 8,000 runs in Test on 21 February (vs Pakistan) 20th All time
  Younis Khan reached 5,000 runs in Test on 24 February (vs Sri Lanka) 74th All time
  Younis Khan scored triple century in Test on 24 February (vs Sri Lanka) 23rd All time
  Jacques Kallis reached 10,000 runs in Test on 27 February (vs Australia) 8th All time

ODI
  Mashrafe Mortaza scored 1,000 runs on 14 October (vs New Zealand), becoming in the 43rd All time cricketer with 1,000 runs and 100 wickets
  Chris Gayle took 150 wickets on 16 November (vs Pakistan) 46th All time
  Harbhajan Singh took 200 wickets on 20 November (vs England) 30th All time
  Virender Sehwag reached 6,000 runs on 23 November (vs England) 39th All time
  Tatenda Taibu reached 100 dismissals on 30 November (vs Sri Lanka) 21st All time
  Chris Gayle scored his 7,000th run on 13 January (vs New Zealand) 26th All time
  Kumar Sangakkara scored his 7,000th run on 16 January (vs Bangladesh) 27th All time
  Jacques Kallis scored his 10,000th run on 23 January (vs Australia) 8th All time
  Nathan Bracken took 150 wickets on 23 January (vs South Africa) 47th All time
  Muttiah Muralitharan got his 500th wicket on 24 January (vs Pakistan) 2nd All Time
  Sanath Jayasuriya scored his 13,000th run on 28 January (vs India) 2nd All Time
  Mahela Jayawardene scored his 8,000th run on 3 February (vs India) 18th All Time
  Irfan Pathan took 150 wickets on 5 February (vs Sri Lanka) 48th All time

Records

Test

  Sachin Tendulkar broke the record of runs on 17 October (vs Australia) with runs scored off Peter Siddle.
  Mahela Jayawardene and Thilan Samaraweera broke the record for the 4th wicket with 437 runs vs Pakistan on 22 February. Shoaib Malik ended the partnership by dismissing Jayawardene. The partnership faced 651 balls and Jayawardene contributed 199 runs, Samaraweera 231 runs.
  Rahul Dravid broke the record of most catches on 6 April (vs New Zealand) upon helping dismiss Tim McIntosh.

ODI
  Ajantha Mendis was fastest to reach 50 wickets on 12 January in his 19th match when he dismissed Ray Price (Zimbabwe).
  Mahela Jayawardene broke the record of catches by non-wicket keeper vs. Pakistan with 157, when he caught Salman Butt on 21 January.
  achieved their highest score in an ODI with 351 for 7 in the victory over Kenya (29 January)
  Muttiah Muralitharan broke the record of wickets taken with 503, when he dismissed Gautam Gambhir on 5 February.

References

External links
2008/09 season on ESPN Cricinfo

 
2008 in cricket
2009 in cricket